Cabestana spengleri, or Spengler's trumpet, is a large predatory sea snail, sometimes called a predatory whelk, a marine gastropod mollusc in the family Cymatiidae. This species is named after the Danish naturalist Lorenz Spengler.

References

Further reading 
 Powell A. W. B., New Zealand Mollusca, William Collins Publishers Ltd, Auckland, New Zealand 1979 
 Glen Pownall, New Zealand Shells and Shellfish, Seven Seas Publishing Pty Ltd, Wellington, New Zealand 1979 

Gastropods of Australia
Gastropods of New Zealand
Cymatiidae
Gastropods described in 1811